Antony Theodore (born 1954) is a bilingual German poet, pastor and educator who writes in both English and German. He writes mostly on spiritual teachings of Jesus Christ and underlying unity of all world religions. His spiritual poems are read as sermons at United Church of Christ. He has also written spiritual biography of the American mystic Thomas Merton. More than 5000 of his poems have been posted on various poetry websites like Poem Hunter, where he is consistently ranked among top world poets.

Life and works
Antony Theodore was born on November 9, 1954, as John Antony Theodore Vazhakuttathil in Alleppey district of Kerala, India. After early demise of his foster mother Genova Maa, Antony migrated to Germany. He studied at Fordham University in New York City and Ludwig Maximilian University in Munich. He obtained two bachelor's degrees and also two doctorate degrees in English literature and philosophy of world religions.
In 1986 when Antony was travelling from Mumbai to Frankfurt the Pan Am 73 flight carrying him got hijacked at Karachi airport. In the 16 hour siege 22 of the 400 passengers were killed. Antony miraculously escaped with four gunshot wounds. After this traumatic experience Antony devoted his life to education and social service. He was ordained a pastor and worked as a chaplain in St Martin, Munich. He has lived and worked most of his life in Dortmund in Germany although he has retained his association with Diocese of Alleppey.  He often conducts charitable fund raising activities for health and social work.

Poetry and spiritual literature
More than 5000 of Antony's poems have been published on poetry websites like Poet Freak, Poem Hunter, Starlite Cafe, Micropoet and Poet's Garden etc. Besides the teachings of Christ, he has also written extensively on the universal truths expressed in the holy books of other world religions like Hinduism, Buddhism, Islam, Judaism, Confucianism and Zoroastrianism etc. His poem anti-abortion poem "I am Your Baby, Mother" has been translated into more than twenty languages including French, Italian, Russian, Greek, Arabic and Hindi. His poetic works on comparative world religions titled Psalms of Love and Jesus Christ in Love have been edited and commented by the Indian poet Dr Tapan Kumar Pradhan.

Bibliography

Books in English

Books in German

Chapters in books

Journal articles

See also
Fordham University
Tapan Kumar Pradhan

Notes

Christian religious leaders
German-language writers
English-language poets
German male poets
20th-century German poets
German people of Indian descent
Fordham University
Ludwig Maximilian University of Munich
Anglo-Indian people
People from Alappuzha district
Fordham University alumni
1954 births
Living people